Pot'onggang station is a railway station in Pulg'ŭn'gori 1-dong, Pot'onggang-guyŏk, P'yŏngyang, North Korea, on the P'yŏngnam Line of the Korean State Railway. 

It is also the starting point of the P'yŏngyanghwajŏn Line to P'yŏngyang's marshalling yard, P'yŏngyang Choch'ajang; from there the line splits, with a branch going to the P'yŏngyang Thermal Power Plant, and another to P'yŏngch'ŏn station and a number of industries in the area. There are sidings for loading freight from a number of freight houses on the south side of the station.

History
The station was opened together with the marshalling yard on 21 March 1944 by the Chosen Government Railway.

Services
Local transit transfers can be made from Pot'onggang station to the Pyongyang Metro's Kŏn'guk station on the Hyŏksin Line, and to P'yŏngyang Tram Line 1.

References

Railway stations in North Korea
Buildings and structures in Pyongyang
Transport in Pyongyang
Railway stations opened in 1944
1944 establishments in Korea